Dashtakar is a village in the Vedi Municipality of the Ararat Province of Armenia.

References 

Kiesling, Rediscovering Armenia, p. 29, available online at the US embassy to Armenia's website

Populated places in Ararat Province